Pararhopaloscelides  is a genus of beetles in the family Cerambycidae, which contains the single species Pararhopaloscelides sericeipennis. It was described by Breuning in 1947.

References

Desmiphorini
Beetles described in 1947
Monotypic beetle genera